Vandayarriruppu is a village in the Orathanadu taluk of Thanjavur district, Tamil Nadu, India.

Demographics 

As per the 2001 census, Vandayarriruppu had a total population of 1844 with 945 males and 899 females. The sex ratio was 951. The literacy rate was 73.1.

References 

 

Villages in Thanjavur district